Ambassador Libérat Mfumukeko is a Burundian diplomat and civil servant. He is currently an IDA / World Bank Borrowers’ Representative where he co-chairs the Africa Group 1 (22 countries), and is also a Charge de Missions at the Presidency of the Republic of Burundi. He was the Secretary General of the East African Community (EAC) from 2 March 2016 to 25 April 2021, replacing Richard Sezibera.

Education
Amb. Mfumukeko has a Bachelor’s degree in Economics from the University of Tours (France), an MBA from Clark University (Massachusetts, USA) and a postgraduate Executive degree in Leadership from the Kennedy School of Government at Harvard University (MA, USA). In 2021 Clark University awarded him a Doctoral degree honoris causa in Humane Letters. Amb. Mfumukeko also has a diploma from the Lomonossov Moscow State University (Russia) where he spent one academic year to learn the Russian language.

Career
At the time of his appointment in 2016 as EAC Secretary General, Amb. Mfumukeko was the Deputy Secretary General responsible for finance and administration at the EAC headquarters in Arusha, Tanzania. Prior to that, he served in several high profile positions including: Principal Adviser to the President of Burundi in charge of Economic Affairs, Director General of REGIDESO (Burundi's energy and water utility), Chairman of the Steering Committee of the East African Power Pool (EAPP), Director General of API (Burundi Investment Promotion Authority), and Economic Expert at the Food and Agriculture Organization of the United Nations (FAO). He also worked for large companies in Europe and the USA where he spent more than 20 years.

Personal
According to the EAC Secretariat, Amb. Mfumukeko is fluent in English, French, Kirundi, Kiswahili and Russian. He has a long international experience, having worked and/or lived in DR Congo, Rwanda, France, USA, Ivory Coast, Cameroun, and Russia.

References

External links
Bujumbura International University - Historical
MFUMUKEKO: East Africans to pay more for goods

Living people
Clark University alumni
Burundian diplomats
Burundian accountants
Government ministers of Burundi
East African Community officials
Year of birth missing (living people)